Nematabad (also Romanized as Ne‘matābād) is a village in Aliabad-e Malek Rural District, in the Central District of Arsanjan County, Fars Province, Iran. At the 2006 census, its population was 117, in 26 families.

References 

Populated places in Arsanjan County